Cinema of Belgium  refers to the film industry based in Belgium. Belgium is essentially a bi-lingual country divided into the Flemish (Dutch-speaking) north and the French-speaking south. There is also a small community of German speakers in the border region with Germany.  Belgium is further a federal country made up of three regions (the Flemish Region, the Walloon Region and the Brussels-Capital Region) and three language communities (the Flemish Community (Dutch-speaking), the French (i.e., French-speaking) Community and the German-speaking Community).
Due to these linguistic and political divisions it is difficult to speak of a national, unified Cinema of Belgium.  It would be more appropriate to talk about Flemish or Dutch-language cinema of Belgium and Walloon or French-language cinema of Belgium.

History

Early history 
While the invention of the cinématographe by the Lumière brothers is widely regarded as the birth of cinema, a number of developments in photography preceded the advent of film. Among the people pioneering work on animation devices was a Belgian professor of experimental physics Joseph Plateau. Plateau, who was active at the Ghent University invented an early stroboscopic device in 1836, the "phenakistiscope". It consisted of two disks, one with small equidistant radial windows, through which the viewer could look, and another containing a sequence of images. When the two disks rotated at the correct speed, the synchronization of the windows and the images created an animated effect. The projection of stroboscopic photographs, creating the illusion of motion, eventually led to the development of cinema.

The first public projection in Belgium took place on 1 March 1896 at the Kings Gallery in Brussels. In the following years there was a surge in activity, initially dominated by the French industrial Charles Pathé. One of his assistants, Alfred Machin founded the first production studio in 1910; some of his films are still preserved in the Royal Filmarchive in Brussels. The first Belgian movie producer was Hippolyte De Kempeneer, who produced several interesting films until his studio burned down in 1923.

1930 - 1980 
The 1930s however saw the first serious attempt at cinema. Several prominent figures such as Charles Dekeukeleire and Henri Storck experimented with new filming techniques and founded the Belgian Documentary School, which was long regarded as one of the highlights of Belgian Cinema. With the advent of sound, directors such as Jan Vanderheyden fully explored the possibilities of the medium, adapting popular literary works such as De Witte of Ernest Claes. De Witte proved to be a pivotal work in the history of Belgian Cinema. The film was a tremendous popular success and would spawn a future remake and a TV series that was widely acclaimed in its own right.

While attempts to produce a serious feature-length film were frequently met with difficulty, Belgian animated films slowly gained a reputation abroad, led by animators such as Raoul Servais, who won several awards throughout the sixties in a career that culminated with a Golden Palm for best short feature in 1979 for Harpya.

From 1964 on, film could be subsidized by the government, making way for a new generation of filmmakers such as André Delvaux (De Man Die Zijn Haar Kort Liet Knippen, after Johan Daisne's novel), Roland Verhavert (Pallieter, after Felix Timmermans's novel) and Harry Kümel.

1980 - 2000 

The 1980s however saw a break with the tradition of the 60s and 70s, which was increasingly perceived as too stagy or otherwise preoccupied with rural dramas, giving rise to more personal and gritty filmmaking, led by people such as Marc Didden (Brussels by Night) and Robbe De Hert (Blueberry Hill, Brylcream Boulevard). 1985 however saw the release of the ambitious but spectacular failure De Leeuw van Vlaanderen, written and directed by Hugo Claus, after Hendrik Conscience's novel. Belgian acclaim in animation continued with an Academy Award for best animated short in 1987 with A Greek Tragedy, by Nicole van Goethem.

Belgian cinema finally took flight during the 1990s, gaining international prominence with such films as Man Bites Dog (with Benoît Poelvoorde), Daens (directed by Stijn Coninx), Rosetta (directed by the Dardenne brothers) and Toto le Héros (Toto the hero) by Jaco Van Dormael. Toto le Héros gained wide critical acclaim, winning both the César Award for best foreign film and the Camera d'Or at the Cannes Film Festival. In 2000, Dominique Deruddere's Everybody Famous! was nominated for the Academy Award for Best Foreign Language Film. Like Rosetta, the Dardenne's 2005 film L'Enfant won the Palme d'Or at the Cannes Film Festival. Other important Walloon directors include Fabrice du Welz, Lucas Belvaux, Bouli Lanners and Vincent Lannoo.

Present 
 
Pauline and Paulette a 2001 comedy-drama film directed and co-written by Lieven Debrauwer was the Belgian entry for the Academy Awards 2001 in the category Best Foreign Language Film but failed to receive the actual nomination. Dora van der Groen was awarded Best Actress in the Joseph Plateau awards for her role as Pauline. Erik Van Looy's detective movie The Alzheimer Case (known internationally as The Memory of a Killer) was released in 2003. Van Looy's follow up thriller Loft opened in 2008 and had twice as many opening weekend admissions as The Alzheimer Case.  Ben X directed by Nic Balthazar became an international success after its release in 2007. The movie was the Belgian Best Foreign Language Film entry in 2007, but failed to be nominated.

Classic literary works continue to be adapted, in particular the work of Willem Elsschot, and often in coproduction with Dutch film companies.

Adaptations of new literary works are also frequent. The Misfortunates directed by Felix Van Groeningen and released in 2009 is an adaptation of the book De helaasheid der dingen by Flemish writer Dimitri Verhulst. The film won several awards including the Prix Art et Essai at the Cannes Film Festival's Quinzaine des Réalisateurs and three Golden Starfish Awards at the 17th Hamptons International Film Festival. The film is the official Belgian entry for the 82nd Academy Awards in 2010 in the category Best Foreign Language Film. Another example of a film adaptation of a modern novel is the 2007 movie Ex Drummer directed by Koen Mortier that was based on the book by Herman Brusselmans of the same name. Mr. Nobody directed by Jaco Van Dormael and released in 2010 gained wide critical acclaim, winning both the Magritte Award for Best Film and the André Cavens Award. In 2012, the Belgian film Rundskop (Bullhead) by Michaël R. Roskam was nominated for the Academy Award for Best Foreign Language Film.

Belgium also annually hosts several film festivals, the most important of which are the Flanders International Film Festival Ghent and the Brussels International Festival of Fantasy Film.

Belgian films 

De Witte (1934)
The Music Teacher (1988)
Home Sweet Home (1973)
Le Choix (1976)
Toto le Héros (Toto the hero) (1991)
Man Bites Dog (1992)
Daens (1993)
Farinelli (1994)
Le Huitième Jour (The Eighth Day) (1996)
Camping Cosmos (1996)
Rosetta (1999)
Everybody's Famous! (2000)
Pauline and Paulette (2001)
The Alzheimer Case (2003)
Steve + Sky (2004)
L'Enfant (2005)
Ben X (2007)
Small Gods (2007)
Loft (2008)
The Misfortunates (2009)
Dirty Mind (2009)
Mr. Nobody (2009)
Luke and Lucy: The Texas Rangers (2009)
Bo (2010)
Oxygen (2010)
Bullhead (2011)
The Broken Circle Breakdown (2012)
Two Days, One Night (2014)
Los Flamencos (2014)
N - The Madness of Reason (2013)
The Brand New Testament (2015)
Laundry Man  (2016)

Notable people

Directors 

Pascal Adant
Chantal Akerman
Yaël André
Jean-Jacques Andrien
Lucas Belvaux
Edmond Bernhard
Jean-Marie Buchet
Jan Bucquoy
Frans Buyens
Stijn Coninx
Robbe De Hert
Eric de Kuyper
Jean-Pierre and Luc Dardenne
Lieven Debrauwer
Charles Dekeukeleire
André Delvaux
Paul Demeyer
Dominique Deruddere
Marc Didden
Frederik Du Chau
Hugo Claus
Anna Frijters
Noël Godin
Marion Hänsel
Patric Jean
Yasmine Kassari
Peter Krüger
Harry Kümel
Joachim Lafosse
Benoît Lamy
Bouli Lanners
Boris Lehman
Roland Lethem
Daniel Maze
Ernst Moerman
Koen Mortier
Picha
Maurice Rabinowicz
Raoul Servais
Olivier Smolders
Ben Stassen
Henri Storck
Samy Szlingerbaum
Boris Szulzinger
Henri d'Ursel
Patrick Van Antwerpen
Jan Vanderheyden
Jaco Van Dormael
Felix Van Groeningen
Erik Van Looy
Roland Verhavert
Jan Verheyen
Julien Vrebos
Thierry Zéno
Fien Troch
Hans Herbots
Daniel Lambo

Actors and actresses 

Matthias Schoenaerts 
Jean-Claude Van Damme 
Jérémie Renier
Annie Cordy
Antje De Boeck
Koen De Bouw
Jan Decleir
Jacques Brel
Cécile de France
Josse De Pauw
Émilie Dequenne
Ann Petersen
Dora Van Der Groen
Stéphane de Groodt
Benoît Poelvoorde
François Damiens
Alexandra Vandernoot
Natacha Régnier
Déborah François

See also
 Cinema of the world

References

Bibliography 
Mathijs, Ernest (ed.), The cinema of the Low Countries, Wallflower Press, London, 2004.

Mosley, Philip, Split screen: Belgian cinema and cultural identity, State University of New York Press, Albany, 2001.

External links 
  Flanders Image- a website dedicated to the Flemish film industry
  cinergie.be- a website dedicated to the Belgian film industry
(in French) Égérie - a website dedicated to the Belgian film industry in French